Sam Houston High School is a high school in an unincorporated area north of Lake Charles, Louisiana, United States. It is a part of Calcasieu Parish Public Schools and was established in 1961.

History
The school opened in 1961 to serve the unincorporated area of Lake Charles north of English Bayou, called Moss Bluff; it succeeded Gillis High School. The school began with an enrollment of 300 students in grades 7–12. Gabe Barkate was the first principal.

In 1976, with the opening of Moss Bluff Middle School, Sam Houston High School transitioned to a traditional 9–12 grade high school.

On January 11, 1982, the school was destroyed by fire, except for the gymnasium. At about 7:10 that morning, the decision had been made not to open the school that day because low gas pressure made it impossible for maintenance staff to turn on the boilers and the classrooms were too cold. By 9 a.m., the roughly 15 teachers who had been at the school were sent home, although, according to the local fire chief, there were at least three people in the building at the time of the fire. At about 11 a.m., eyewitnesses reported two explosions and smoke coming from the school's west wing, near the chemistry lab. Some 50 firefighters from the surrounding areas were called to the fire, but the majority of the school burned to the ground. The fire was considered either a possible arson or the result of a gas problem, but the cause was not established. Students attended classes at their arch-rival Westlake High School & Moss Bluff Middle School until the school was rebuilt and reopened in February 1984.

Campus
The current complex includes, in addition to classrooms, administrative space, and faculty lounges: a football, baseball, and softball stadium, boys' and girls' basketball gymnasiums, an athletics fieldhouse, an agricultural education building, and a library and courtyard constructed in 2010–2012. Their football team is called the "barbe-beater". Recently in 2019 they started the BYOD (Bring your own device) program, which is the only school in Louisiana to use this policy so far. Other schools are taking notes on this new rule.

Athletics
Sam Houston High athletics competes in the LHSAA.

Notable alumni
David Filo (1984), co-founder of Yahoo!.
Ralph Eggleston, animator for Pixar Animation Studios.

References

External links
 Sam Houston High School

Public high schools in Louisiana
Schools in Calcasieu Parish, Louisiana
1961 establishments in Louisiana
Educational institutions established in 1961